Robert Laughlin Pierson (1926–1997) was an Episcopal clergyman and Freedom Rider and a named appellant in Pierson v. Ray, 386 U.S. 547 (1967).

Life
He was born in Chicago in 1926.
He graduated from Lawrence University, the University of Wisconsin, and Nashotah House.

He served at St. Barnabas' Episcopal Church.
In 1961, he was arrested at Jackson, Mississippi, with the Freedom Riders. Pierson was among the litigants who pursued damages against the police based on the Civil Rights Act of 1871 and was the named appellant in the 1967 U.S. Supreme Court case, Pierson v. Ray which found that the police had Qualified Immunity, and rejected Pierson's claims.

He died on April 13, 1997, in St. Petersburg, Florida.

Family
In 1955, he married Ann Clark Rockefeller, daughter of Nelson Rockefeller. They divorced in 1966.

References

External links
Freedom Riders

1926 births
1997 deaths
Freedom Riders
Lawrence University alumni
University of Wisconsin–Madison alumni
Nashotah House alumni